Bartholomew Township is a township in Lincoln County, Arkansas, United States. Its total population was 687 as of the 2010 United States Census, a decrease of 19.84 percent from 857 at the 2000 census.

According to the 2010 Census, Bartholomew Township is located at  (34.030863, -91.771290).

References

External links 

Townships in Arkansas
Populated places in Lincoln County, Arkansas